Following is a list of the professional National Basketball Association Draft selections of the Philadelphia 76ers, beginning in 1950.

Philadelphia 76ers (1964–present)

Syracuse Nationals (1950–1963)

References 

 

 
National Basketball Association draft
draft history